Ritchie Coster (born 1 July 1967) is an English actor. He is best known for playing the roles of Dietrich Banning in The Tuxedo (2002), the Chechen in The Dark Knight (2008), Elias Kassar in Blackhat (2015), Mayor Austin Chessani on the second season of the HBO anthology television series True Detective and Francisco Scaramucci / Mr. Blue on the SyFy television series Happy!.

Early life 

Coster was born in London, England. He attended the Latymer School, Edmonton and later trained in acting at the Guildhall School of Music and Drama. The youngest of four brothers. An early on screen appearance was a brief talking role in the British Broadcasting Corporation's soap drama EastEnders.

Career 
Coster has played various roles throughout his career, in the 1998 remake of Rear Window, he played the sculptor who was married to the bottle loving woman Ilene played by Allison Mackie. In television roles he has appeared in at least seven episodes of the television series Law & Order from 1999 to 2009 in a range of roles.

Filmography

Film

Television

Video games

References

External links
 
 
 
 Ritchie Coster's official site

1967 births
Living people
English male film actors
English male television actors
English male stage actors
Male actors from London
People from Edmonton, London
21st-century English male actors
Alumni of the Guildhall School of Music and Drama
20th-century English male actors